The International Society for Autonomic Neuroscience is a scientific society of researchers studying the autonomic nervous system. The society organizes scientific meetings, publishes a scientific journal, and supports students through awards and travel grants. It is a non-profit and non-governmental organization.

History 
The society was founded in 1995, because it was felt that the key international society covering neuroscience, the International Brain Research Organization, was not sufficiently representing research on this part of the nervous system. The first president was Geoffrey Burnstock. Elsewhere, it has been claimed that the society originated because of the Journal of Autonomic Neuroscience, presumably because discussions amongst the early editors identified lack of scientific exchange, at an international level, amongst researchers in the field.

Initially, scientific meetings were organized every 3 years, before settling into a biennial pattern. Meetings have been held in Australia, the United Kingdom, Japan, Canada, France, Brazil, Germany and Italy.

Journal 
The official journal of the society is Autonomic Neuroscience: Basic and Clinical. This journal publishes the congress abstracts and supports student poster and presentation prizes.

Collaboration with regional societies 
The society collaborates with several autonomic regional societies, having similar aims, in organizing joint meetings. These societies include: 
 American Autonomic Society
 European Federation of Autonomic Societies
 Japan Society of Neurovegetative Research

References

External links 
 
 American Autonomic Society
 Autonomic Neuroscience: Basic and Clinical
 European Federation of Autonomic Societies

Neuroscience organizations
Organizations established in 1995